Eriogonum nummulare is a species of wild buckwheat known by the common names Kearney's buckwheat and money buckwheat. It is native to the Great Basin of the United States from California to Utah, where it grows on sandy slopes and plateaus.

This is a shrub reaching heights of anywhere from 30 centimeters to one meter and sprawling up to one and a half meters in width. It forms a pale green patch of woolly leaves at its base and produces a branching inflorescence which may have leaves on its thin stems. At each node along the inflorescence is a cluster of tiny flowers, which are usually white.

External links
Jepson Manual Treatment
Photo gallery

nummulare
Flora of Arizona
Flora of Nevada
Flora of Utah
Flora of the California desert regions
Flora without expected TNC conservation status